Joseph Paul Christopher Hatton (3 February 1837 (baptised in Andover 22 March 1837) – 31 July 1907) was an English novelist and journalist. His brother Joshua Hatton was also a journalist.

Hatton accompanied Henry Irving on an North American tour to write his biography.

Joseph Hatton died in St John's Wood, Middlesex at the age of 70.

Works
Editor 
Bristol Mirror
Gentleman's Magazine
School Board Chronicle
Illustrated Midland News
The Sunday Times
The People (1892)

Novels (incomplete)
In title order:
Bitter Sweets: a Love Story, London, 1865
By Order of the Czar. A Novel, New York: John W. Lovell, 1890
By Order of the Czar. A drama in five acts, London: Hutchinson & Co., 1904
Captured by Cannibals. Some incidents in the life of Horace Duran, London: Hodder & Stoughton, 1888
Christopher Henrick: his Life and Adventures London, 1869
Cigarette Papers for after dinner smoking Anthony Treherne & Co.: London, 1902
Clytie: a Novel of Modern Life London, Guildford, 1874
Cruel London London, 1878
The Dagger and the Cross London: Hutchinson & Co., 1897
The Gay World London: Hurst & Blackett, 1877
In Male Attire: a Romance of the Day London: Hutchinson & Co., 1900
In the Lap of Fortune. A story stranger than fiction. London, 1873
John Needham's Double, London: John & Robert Maxwell, 1885 (also a play, 1891)
Kites and Pigeons London, 1872
The Park Lane Mystery: a Story of Love and Magic London, 1887
The Princess Mazaroff. A romance London: Hutchinson & Co., 1891
The Queen of Bohemia London, 1877
The Tallants of Barton: A Tale of Fortune and Finance, London: Tinsley Brothers, 1867
The Valley of Poppies London: Chapman and Hall, 1871  
Three Recruits, and the girls they left behind them London : Hurst & Blackett, 1880
The Old House at Sandwich, 1892
The White King of Manoa, London: Hutchinson & Co., 1899
Contribution to The Fate of Fenella, 1892

Non-fiction
Henry Irving's Impression of America, Boston: James R Osgood, 1884
North Borneo: Explorations and Adventures on the Equator [with son, Frank Hatton], London: Sampson Low, 1885

References

External links

19th-century English writers
1841 births
1907 deaths
British newspaper editors
The Sunday People people
19th-century British journalists
British male journalists
19th-century English male writers